Konaruiyeh (also Romanized as Konārū’īyeh; also known as Kenārū and Konārū) is a village in Esfandaqeh Rural District, in the Central District of Jiroft County, Kerman Province, Iran. At the 2006 census, its population was 219, in 44 families.

References 

Populated places in Jiroft County